Pink Panther is the debut album by South African R&B singer Tshego. The album was released on 29 August 2019, by Twenty Five Eight Entertainment, and licensed by Universal Music South Africa, a division of Universal Music Group. The album was executively produced by Tshego, and Alie Keys; with additional production from Yaw Bannerman, Gemini Major, and Lunatik. It features guest appearances from King Monada, Riky Rick, Kwesta, Black Class, Tellaman, Thabsie, Focalistic, and Frank Casino.

Background
Following his exit from Family Tree in 2018, after winning a court case against the label owner Cassper Nyovest; and gained back ownership of all his masters; released under the label. In 2019, Tshego imprint Twenty Five Eight Entertainment; signed a licensing deal with Universal Music Africa; and released his first single "No Ties", off Pink Panther project; through Universal Music Africa.

On 5 June 2019, before the release of "No Ties", he announced his plans on releasing his debut studio album in July.

On 4 October 2019, he held a listening session at African Beer Emporium in Pretoria. With guess artist from Riky Rick, Nadia Nakai, Gemini Major, Major League DJz, Focalistic, 25K, DBN Gogo, DJ Venom, DJ Banques, DJ Smokes, among others.

Promotion
On September 10, 2020, he launched Pink Panther clothing, in partnership with Factorie, and available for purchase at RoseBank.

Singles
On 26 July 2019, he released the lead single of the album, "No Ties", featuring King Monada, accompanied by a music video. In November 2019, the single  was certified gold by the Recording Industry of South Africa (RISA); On 9 July 2020, his single "No Ties" was announced among the nominees at the 26th SAMA Awards for Record of the Year.

On 21 January 2020, Tshego released an amapiano remix of "No Ties", with guess vocals from King Monada, and MFR Souls.

Accolades

Track listing
Credits adapted from Genius.

Personnel
Tshegofatso Ketshabile – vocals, songwriting, executive producer, production 
Alie Keys – executive producer, production 
Yaw Bannerman - production 
Gemini Major – production 
Lunatik Beatz – production

Release history

References

2019 debut albums
Rhythm and blues albums by South African artists